12 Imaginary Inches is an album released by the 1970s-style Orange County, California, punk rock band The Stitches.

Track listing
Original CD

External links 

The Stitches albums
2002 albums